Earth snake may refer to the following genus:
 Geophis

It may also refer to the following species:
 Smooth earth snake, Virginia valeriae